The scope of this list is limited to capital cities of first-level administrative divisions such as provinces, autonomous regions, municipalities, and special administrative regions, also including sub-provincial cities which are governed by a province but administered independently in many ways from a province.



Provincal-level capitals
 
 Note: The People's Republic of China claims Taiwan as one of its provinces, which it does not control.

Sub-provincial cities that are not themselves provincial capitals 
Sub-provincial cities have a status that is below that of the municipalities, which are independent and equivalent to provinces, but above other, regular prefecture-level cities, which are completely ruled by their respective provinces. However, these sub-provincial cities are marked the same as other provincial capitals (or a prefecture-level city if the city is not a provincial capital) on almost all maps.

In total, there are five sub-provincial cities that are not themselves provincial capitals. These five cities have been designated as the "Municipalities with Independent Planning Status".

List of the Municipalities with Independent Planning Status 

With the exception of Fuzhou, the provincial capital of Fujian Province, the provincial capitals of the other four provinces listed above – Guangzhou, Shenyang, Jinan, and Hangzhou – are themselves sub-provincial cities. Before 1997, when Chongqing was a sub-provincial city of Sichuan Province, provincial capital Chengdu was also a sub-provincial city.

See also

 Historical capitals of China
 List of cities in China
 List of cities in China by population
 List of the current and former capitals of the subdivisions of China

.
 
Capitals
Capitals
China, People's Republic
China, province-level capitals and sub-provincial cities
Populated places in China